"Mháirín Óg Ní Cheallaigh" (IPA:[ˈwaːɾʲiːnʲˈoːɡˈnʲiːˈçal̪ˠiː]) is a 17th-century Irish folk song.  It was collected in County Tyrone between 1908 and 1914 by the Gaelic League. Philip Ua Bhaldra was the collector, he being active in the area from 1906 to 1921.

The song concerns the separation of a Rapparee from his lover, Mháirín Óg Ní Cheallaigh, daughter of the Ó Chellaigh of Mountbellew, in the aftermath of the Battle of Aughrim, 12 July 1691.

See also

 Tomás Bán Mac Aodhagáin
 Dónal Ó Maoláine
 Éamonn an Chnoic
 Peigín Leitir Móir

References

 A Mháirín Óg Ní Cheallaigh:A Tyrone Song of Connacht Provenance, Peter Smith (Peadar Mac Gahbann), Dúiche Néill, pp. 216–230, number 17, 2008.

People from County Galway
17th-century Irish people
17th-century songs
Irish-language songs